The 2021–22 UC Irvine Anteaters men's basketball team represented the University of California, Irvine in the 2021–22 NCAA Division I men's basketball season. They played their home games at the Bren Events Center in Irvine, California as a member of the Big West Conference. The Anteaters were led by 12th-year head coach Russell Turner.

Previous season

The team finished the season with an 18–9 (10–4) record finishing 2nd place in the standings and advanced to the 2021 Big West Conference men's basketball tournament where they were defeated by UC Santa Barbara 63–79. The Anteaters continued their success finishing 1st or 2nd for 7 straight seasons in the Big West Conference and 4 straight Big West tournament Championship games (the 2020 Big West Conference men's basketball tournament was canceled due to the COVID-19 pandemic). The school set a new scoring record and the largest margin of victory (80) on November 28, 2020 over NCCAA opponent Bethesda University by the score of 135–55. Also new school records broken in that game were assists (31) and FGs made (56). New Bren Events Center records broken were the most points scored in a first half (70) and game FG % (0.691).

Roster

Source

Schedule and results

|-
!colspan=12 style=""| Exhibition

|-
!colspan=12 style=| Non-conference regular season

|-
!colspan=12 style=| Big West regular season

|-
!colspan=12 style=| Big West tournament

|-

Source

References

UC Irvine Anteaters men's basketball seasons
UC Irvine
UC Irvine
UC Irvine